The 2015–16 Borussia Dortmund season was the 105th season (and 106th overall year) in the football club's history and 40th consecutive and 49th overall season in the top flight of German football, the Bundesliga, having been promoted from the 2. Bundesliga in 1976.

In addition to the domestic league, Borussia Dortmund also participated in this season's editions of the domestic cup, the DFB-Pokal, and the second-tier continental cup, the UEFA Europa League. This was the 43rd season for the club in the Westfalenstadion, located in Dortmund, Germany. The stadium had a capacity of 81,359 for Bundesliga matches, and a capacity of 65,851 for continental matches. The season covered a period from 1 July 2015 to 30 June 2016.

The season was the first since 2000–01 without Sebastian Kehl, who retired after the 2014–15 season.

Season overview

Background
Dortmund finished the previous season in seventh place in the Bundesliga, one of its worst finishes in recent years. It won the DFL-Supercup in the previous season, but was unable to qualify for this season. Dortmund also progressed to the round of 16 in the 2014–15 UEFA Champions League before being knocked out by Juventus. This season, Dortmund only qualified for the 2015–16 UEFA Europa League, the second-tier continental cup. They entered the competition in the third qualifying round. If they advance from this round, they must also get through the play-off round before qualifying for the group stage. Last season, Dortmund ended up as runners-up of the DFB-Pokal after losing to VfL Wolfsburg. Dortmund will begin the season with new coach Thomas Tuchel, who replaced Jürgen Klopp.

Pre-season
The pre-season began with training starting on 29 June 2015. The first pre-season friendly was on 3 July against VfL Rhede. The next day, the season opening event took place with another friendly match against "Team Gold". After this, Dortmund went on a tour of Asia from 5–11 July. They played in two friendlies against Kawasaki Frontale in Japan on 7 July and Johor Darul Ta'zim (Southern Tigers) in Malaysia on 9 July. They then returned to Germany to face VfL Bochum on 17 July before heading to Bad Ragaz in Switzerland for a training camp. This took place from 19–26 July. They faced FC Luzern on 21 July and Juventus on 25 July, the team who knocked them out of the previous edition of the Champions League. After the Swiss training camp, they returned to Germany.

July–August
Competitive matches began on 30 July with the first leg of the UEFA Europa League third qualifying round. The draw for who they will face took place on 17 July. Dortmund were drawn to Austria side Wolfsberger AC. The second leg will take place on 6 August. Round 1 of the DFB-Pokal will take place on 7–10 August, where Dortmund will face Chemnitzer FC away. Matchday 1 of the Bundesliga will then take place from 14–16 August. If Dortmund advances to the play-off round, they will play the first leg on 20 August and the second leg on 27 August. The draw would be talking place on 7 August.

In their first Bundesliga game, Dortmund convincingly beat Borussia Mönchengladbach 4–0 with goals from Marco Reus, Pierre-Emerick Aubameyang and two from Henrikh Mkhitaryan, allowing them to temporarily claim position second in the league, behind rivals Bayern Munich on goal difference.

Players
Players and squad numbers last updated on 28 September 2015.Note: Flags indicate national team as has been defined under FIFA eligibility rules. Players may hold more than one non-FIFA nationality.

Transfers

In

Total spending:  €20 million

Out

Statistics

Appearances and goals

|-
! colspan=14 style=background:#dcdcdc; text-align:center| Goalkeepers

|-
! colspan=14 style=background:#dcdcdc; text-align:center| Defenders

|-
! colspan=14 style=background:#dcdcdc; text-align:center| Midfielders

|-
! colspan=14 style=background:#dcdcdc; text-align:center| Forwards

|-
! colspan=14 style=background:#dcdcdc; text-align:center| Players transferred out during the season

Goalscorers
This includes all competitive matches.  The list is sorted by shirt number when total goals are equal.

Last updated on 22 March 2016
Europa League excludes goal in Europa League Qualification

Disciplinary record

Technical staff

Pre-season and friendlies

Competitions

Bundesliga

League table

Results summary

Results by round

Matches

DFB-Pokal

UEFA Europa League

Third qualifying round

Play-off round

Group stage

Knockout phase

Round of 32

Round of 16

Quarter-finals

Summary

References

Borussia Dortmund seasons
Borussia Dortmund
Borussia Dortmund